The 2003 Guinea-Bissau coup d'état was the bloodless military coup that took place in Guinea-Bissau on 14 September 2003, led by General Veríssimo Correia Seabra against incumbent President Kumba Ialá. Seabra referred to the "incapacity" of Ialá's government as justification for the takeover, together with a stagnant economy, political instability, and military discontent over unpaid salaries. Ialá publicly announced his resignation on 17 September, and a political agreement signed that month prohibited him from participating in politics for five years. A civilian-led transitional government led by businessman Henrique Rosa and PRS secretary general Artur Sanhá was set up at the end of September.

See also 

History of Guinea-Bissau
Saloum (film), a 2021 film set during the coup

References 

Military coups in Guinea-Bissau
Coup
Guinea-Bissau coup d'état
Guinea-Bissau coup d'état, 2003
Guinea-Bissau coup d'état